CSS Squib, also referred to as Infanta, was a small torpedo boat in the service of the Confederate States Navy in 1864. She operated in the James River. Her armament consisted of one spar torpedo.

On the night of 9 April, 1864, Lieutenant Hunter Davidson, CSN, the Confederate torpedo expert, sailed Squib through the Federal fleet off Newport News, Virginia, and exploded 53 pounds of powder against the side of flagship  before returning up the James River to safety. The torpedo was exploded too near the surface to achieve maximum effect, and Minnesota escaped without serious damage. For his gallant and meritorious conduct in the performance of this exploit, Davidson was promoted to the rank of commander in the Confederate States Navy. The final disposition of Squib has not been established.

References

Torpedo boats of the Confederate States Navy
Squib-class torpedo boats